Snip may refer to:
 Scotland-Northern Ireland pipeline, a natural gas interconnector
 Snip (aircraft), a Dutch aircraft made in the 1930s
 Snip (horse), a racehorse
 The snip, a minor surgical procedure
 The Snip, a lake in the United States
 The Snip (album), a 2002 jazz album
 Tin snip, a tool used to cut thin sheet metal
 William Snip (1932–2009), Canadian professional wrestler
 Single-nucleotide polymorphism, SNP, pronounced snip
 Snip (Horse markings): a white marking on the muzzle, between the nostrils of a horse or pony.
 Source normalized impact per paper (abbreviated SNIP), a metric of the quality and impact of an academic journal

In fiction
 Snip (Modern Family), an episode of Modern Family
 SNIP, a fictional robot in the television series Snorks
 Snip (puppet), a fictional character in the television series Ace Lightning
 Snip (TV series), a 1976 comedy television series

See also
 Snipe (disambiguation)
 Snipper
 Snipping
 Snips
 SNP (disambiguation)